"Keep on Singing" is a 1973 song composed by Danny Janssen and Bobby Hart, and was originally recorded by Austin Roberts from the album Austin Roberts. It was released as a single on Chelsea Records and reached No. 50 on the U.S. Billboard Hot 100 and No. 39 on the Cash Box Top 100.  In Canada it reached # 79.  "Keep on Singing" was best known as a hit single by Helen Reddy in 1974.

Chart performance

Helen Reddy version

Helen Reddy recorded the song for her 1974 album Love Song for Jeffrey. It served as the lead single from the album and reached No. 15 on the Billboard Hot 100 that May, and No. 10 on the Cash Box Top 100.  The song also reached No. 10 in Canada. The B-side of Reddy's lead single was a cover version of Billy Joel's "You're My Home".

"Keep On Singing" was a yet greater Adult Contemporary hit, reaching No. 1 on both the U.S. and Canadian Easy Listening charts.  The song was also a hit in Australia, peaking at No. 22.

Chart performance

Weekly charts

Year-end charts

Other cover versions
Terry Williams of The First Edition cut it as a B-side for MGM Records in 1973.
Barbara Mandrell covered "Keep on Singing" for her 1974 This Time I Almost Made It album.
The song appears on Aileen Quinn's 1982 album Bobby's Girl.
A live version of "Keep on Singing" is featured on the 1976 Live in Japan album by Dolenz, Jones, Boyce & Hart.
A Finnish rendering: "Anna Laulun Lohduttaa", was recorded by Ami Aspelund for her 1974 Ami album.
 The Wynners

References

External links
 

1973 singles
1974 singles
Austin Roberts (singer) songs
Helen Reddy songs
Songs written by Bobby Hart
Capitol Records singles
1972 songs